Frugarolo is a comune (municipality) in the Province of Alessandria in the Italian region Piedmont, located about  southeast of Turin and about  southeast of Alessandria.

Frugarolo borders the following municipalities: Alessandria, Bosco Marengo, Casal Cermelli, and Castellazzo Bormida.

References